The Paraguayan football derby, also named as the Superclásico (Super derby); is a football (soccer) fixture played between Cerro Porteño and Club Olimpia, the two most successful and popular clubs from Asunción, Paraguay.

Statistics

Head to head
 Updated as of May 22, 2022

Other stats
Other stats from the Paraguayan Derby:
 First match: Cerro Porteño won 3-1 (1913).
 Largest wins: in an official match goes to Cerro, in an 8–1 win from 1937. Olimpia's biggest win was registered in a non official match with amateur players in 1916, with a result of 10–1.
 Most wins in a row by Cerro: five consecutive, in 1986 (2-0, 2–1) and 1987 (2-0, 2–1, 1–0).
 Most wins in a row by Olimpia: four consecutive in two occasions; in 1925 (3-1, 3–0) and 1926 (4-1,  3–0), and 1980 (2-0) and 1981 (1-0, 1–0, 1–0).
 Unbeaten streaks: both teams have a record of 10 games without losing to each other. Cerro was unbeaten for 10 games between July 1992 and July 1995; while Olimpia was unbeaten for 11 games between October 2001 and September 2004 (10, in the regular championship).
 Overall Top Scorers: for Olimpia is Mauro Caballero with 10 goals (9 in the Paraguayan League and 1 in Copa Libertadores) and for Cerro is Saturnino Arrua with 11 goals (7 in the Paraguayan League and 4 in the Copa Libertadores).
 Top Scorers in a single game: Dante Lopez for Olimpia, scoring 4 goals in 2005 and Pedro Osorio for Cerro, scoring 4 goals in 1937.
 Most goals by a player in a single season: Arístides Del Puerto, Rafael Bobadilla and Mauro Caballero have all scored five goals in a single season (in 1967, 1983, 1998 respectively).

Players to score for both clubs

Vital clashes from recent years
In 1999, Olimpia, winners of that year's Torneo Apertura (Opening Championship) were going for their third consecutive Absoluto (Overall) title. The opponents that day were Torneo Clausura (Closing Championship) winners Cerro Porteño. The first leg went to El Decano 1–0, with everything to play for ahead of the return, billed as "The last derby of the Millennium".

Cerro flew out of the blocks to take a 2–0 lead, courtesy of goals from Osvaldo Peralta and Juan Manuel Sara. Not to be denied, Carlos Humberto Paredes, Virginio Cáceres and Walter Avalos all scored for Olimpia to turn the game on its head and win the coveted triple crown.

However, the Cerro Porteño would have their revenge six years later, in a thrilling finale to the 2005 Clausura. The penultimate match of the campaign saw second-placed Cerro host leaders Olimpia, El Rey de Copas holding a precious one-point lead over their near neighbours. It was the visitors who struck first through Carlos Galvan with a half court strike, before El Ciclón fought back to record a crucial win with goals from Walter Fretes, Julio dos Santos and Erwin Avalos.

On the final matchday, with their fate now in their own hands, 2005 Apertura winners Cerro Porteño held firm to defeat General Caballero, a victory that clinched both the Clausura and the overall 2005 championship.

In 2010 up until the derby Cerro was undefeated. In the first derby of the year Cerro was winning 2-1 but ended up losing 3–2.

In 2012 Olimpia was the Apertura leader with a six-point advantage over Cerro Porteño but ended up losing the title to Cerro after losing too much ground in the last 2 matches and Cerro winning both of them, Santiago Salcedo broke the deadlock after scoring from a Penalty shot and later Jonathan Fabbro scored a spectacular Free Kick while Olimpia tried but failed to tie after Arnaldo Castorino´s goal.

Three years later in 2015 Olimpia would have their revenge after both teams ending the season with the same number of points a playoff match decided the title, Olimpia dominated the match but the pitch was in bad conditions plus a controversial handball by Fidencio Oviedo was not called by the referee. In the second half of the Match Olimpia first scored through Freddy Bareiro who caught a rebound from goalkeeper and later Uruguayan Internacional Diego Lugano scored an own goal for Olimpia after trying to clear off a dangerous free kick from Claudio Vargas, Cerro tried to come back to the game after Guillermo Beltran scored but it was not enough, Olimpia won its 40 local title.

Last encounters

Players who have played for both clubs
List of players who have played for Cerro Porteño and Olimpia Asunción

  Carlos Bonet
  Carlos Gamarra
  Casiano Delvalle
  Diego Barreto
  Fabian Caballero
  Fredy Bareiro
  Gabriel Gonzalez
  Ivan Torres
  Nelson Cuevas
  Pablo Zeballos
  Rodrigo Rojas
  Sergio Aquino
  Sergio Goycochea
  Willian Candia

References

External links
 Cerro Porteño
 Olimpia
 Football Derbies
 The Classic from FIFA.com

Football in Paraguay
Association football rivalries
Club Olimpia
Cerro Porteño
1913 establishments in Paraguay